Salt to the Sea is a 2016 historical fiction young adult novel by Ruta Sepetys (book cover illustration and design by Matt Jones i UK). It tells the story of four individuals in World War II who make their way to the ill-fated MV Wilhelm Gustloff. The story also touches on the disappearance of the Amber Room, a world-famous, ornately decorated chamber stolen by the Nazis that has never been recovered.

Sepetys was awarded the 2017 Carnegie Medal, the UK's most prestigious children's book award, for Salt to the Sea.

Background
Sepetys wanted to write about an element of World War II that had been forgotten. She writes in her Author's Note for the novel that even though the sinking of the Wilhelm Gustloff is the deadliest maritime disaster in history, "remarkably, most people have never heard of it." She continues writing: "Every nation has hidden history, countless stories preserved only by those who experienced them. Stories of war are often read and discussed worldwide by readers whose nations stood on opposite sides during the battle. History divided us, but through reading we can be united in story, study, and remembrance. Books join us together as a global reading community, but more importantly, a global human community striving to learn from the past."

Sepetys is the daughter of a Lithuanian refugee. She told the Chicago Tribune  that after she wrote Between Shades of Gray, which was inspired by the history of Lithuania, that her father's cousin told her she should write the story of the "Wilhelm Gustloff." In an interview with NPR Sepetys also shared that her father's cousin had a ticket to board the Wilhelm Gustoff. However, she was ultimately unable to board the ship. Sepetys father's cousin wanted the story to be told as a way to give a voice to those who lost their lives on the Ship. Sepetys goes on to say, "And I was fascinated by the story, wondering why it is that some parts of history penetrate our collective consciousness, and others remain hidden?"

She also told the Tribune that she wanted to write the story from the refugees' point of view. She says, "The concept of "refugee" is something frightening, it's something foreign. So I wanted to write from that point of view, which is why I have four alternating main characters, all young people from different nations, seeing life from four different cultural lenses on this refugee trek."

Plot 
Salt to the Sea takes place in East Prussia in 1945. The book follows four central characters as they evacuate their home countries: Emilia, a teenage, Polish orphan;  Florian, a restoration artist from East Prussia; Joana, a Lithuanian nurse; and Alfred, a Nazi.

Emilia and Florian meet when Florian saves Emilia from a Russian soldier. The couple runs into Joana as she is traveling with a group of refugees. Everyone is attempting to make it to West Germany to board ships and save their own lives.

Throughout the journey to the evacuation ships, the refugees get to know one another. It is revealed that Emilia is eight months pregnant after an assault by Russian soldiers; Florian, the restoration artist, is on the run for stealing a piece of art from the Amber Room; and Joana feels responsible for some of the deaths of her family. By the time the group reaches the evacuation ships, their relationships are solidified. It is clear that Joana and Florian have fallen in love, and Emilia sees Florian as a symbol of good men.

At this point, the group comes into contact with Alfred who is their only hope of getting tickets to the boats. They board the Wilhelm Gustoff.

While on the boat the story progresses. Emilia gives birth; Joana works as a nurse; Florian hides from Nazis who are looking for him. One day, Russian torpedoes hit the Wilhelm Gustoff (the boat they are on). Quickly, the ship sinks, and thousands die. However, Joana, Florian, and Emilia's baby can escape on a lifeboat along with a boy named Klaus. Emilia, on the other hand, finds herself on a different lifeboat with Alfred, the Nazi. It comes to light that Emilia is Polish and Alfred attempts to kill her. Ultimately, both Emilia and Alfred perish.

The book concludes with a glimpse into the future. Joana and Florian live in the United States. They have Emilia's baby, the boy Klaus, and a child of their own. In a letter sent by Clara Christensen, a Danish woman, it is told that Emilia's body was found washed up on shore, and she was buried.

Reception
M.T. Anderson of The New York Times praised Sepetys' writing. In reviewing the book, Anderson wrote, "once again, Ruta Sepetys acts as champion of the interstitial people so often ignored — whole populations lost in the cracks of history."

The judges who awarded Sepetys the Carnegie Medal for this book noted "the powerful, crafted language, the tight, carefully shaped plot and the range of moods evoked throughout"..

The book was honored as a finalist of the Amelia Elizabeth Walden Award in 2017.

Characters
Joana Vilkas: The cousin of Lina Vilkas, the main protagonist in Ruta Sepetys' debut novel, Between Shades of Gray (2011).  Joana is a 21-year-old woman fleeing from her native country Lithuania, who had repatriated to Nazi Germany with her family in 1941 to escape capture from the Soviet Russian forces. She develops a romantic relationship with Florian Beck, whom she calls "the Prussian". She is a crossover character from another book by Sepetys.
Florian Beck: A young Prussian art restoration apprentice carrying a valuable amber swan that he stole from the Amber Room, after discovering that he is a puppet of Erich Koch's. He develops a romantic relationship with Joana.
Emilia Stożek: A 15-year-old Polish girl from Lwów who was raped by Russian soldiers not far from Nemmersdorf. She is caught in an illusion that a boy named August, a member of the family she was working for, was the source of her pregnancy. She planned on finding him after the war. She gives birth to a daughter, Halinka, whom she saves and hands over to Florian during the sinking before dying and being washed up in Bornholm, Denmark.
 Alfred Frick: An eager, delusional young German who adheres to Adolf Hitler's propaganda (he quotes Mein Kampf) and thinks highly of himself. His thought processes and secrets are revealed via letters he mentally composes to Hannelore, a Jewish girl back in his hometown. He dies after a struggle with Emilia.

Film adaptation

On May 25, 2017, Variety reported that Universal Pictures was developing Salt to the Sea into a film.  Scott Neustadter and Michael H. Weber have been tapped to adapt the novel into a screenplay. Their credits include (500) Days of Summer (2009 film), The Fault in Our Stars (2014 film), Our Souls At Night (2017 film), and The Disaster Artist (2017 film).

Recognition

National Awards
A #1 New York Times Bestseller 
Winner of the Carnegie Medal
A New York Times Notable Book
Winner of the Indies Choice Award 2017
Winner of the Golden Kite Award for Fiction 2016
A Junior Library Guild Selection
Winner of the Goodreads Choice Awards 2016
Finalist for the Amelia Elizabeth Walden Award 2017
Notable Books for a Global Society 2017
Winner of the Crystal Kite Award for Fiction 2017
Publishers Weekly Best Young Adult Books of 2016
School Library Journal Best Books of 2016
Booklist Top Ten Books for Youth 2016
ALA Notable Books for Children Nominee 2016
YALSA Top Ten Teen Books of 2017
Shelf Awareness Best Teen Novels of 2016
Winner of the Cybils Award for Young Adult Fiction 2016
Los Angeles Public Library Best Teen Books of 2016
Capitol Choices List 2017
ILA Young Adult Reading List 2017

International Awards
 Winner of the CIal in the UK
Winner of the Golden Dragon Book Award in Hong Kong
Winner of the Prix Farniente in Belgium
Finalist for the Sakura Medal in Japan
Finalist for the Inky Awards in Australia

State Awards
Beehive Book Awards 2018 Nominee (UT)
Black Bear 2017-2018 Reading List (NM)
Blue Hen Book Award 2018 Nominee (DE)
California Young Reader Medal 2017-2018 Winner (CA)
Eliot Rosewater High School Book Award 2017-2018 Nominee (IN)
Florida Teens Read 2017-2018 Winner (FL)
Flume Teen Reader's Choice Award 2018 Nominee (NH)
Gateway Readers Award 2018-2019 Final Nominee (MO)
Georgia Children's Book Award 2017-2018 Nominee (GA)
Grand Canyon Reader Award 2018 Nominee (AZ)
Great Lakes Great Books Award 2017-2018 Nominee (MI)
Green Mountain Book Award 2017-2018 Nominee (VT)
Indiana Read Alouds 2017 Master List (IN)
Iowa Teen Award 2017-2018 Nominee (IA)
Just One More Page! 2017 Master List (WI)
Kentucky Bluegrass Award 2016-2017 master list (KY)
Keystone to Reading Book Award 2018 Finalist (PA)
Lincoln Book Award 2018 Nominee (IL)
Magnolia Book Awards 2018 Nominee (MS)
North Carolina Young Adult Book Award 2017-2018 Nominee (NC)
Nutmeg Book Award 2019 Nominee (CT)
NYC Reads 365 2017-2018 Booklist (NY)
Oregon Reader's Choice Award 2019 Nominee (OR)
Pennsylvania Young Reader's Choice Award 2017-2018 Master list (PA)
Florida Young Adult Reader's Choice Award 2016 (FL)
Rhode Island Teen Book Award 2018 Honor Book (RI) 
Rhode Island Teen Book Award 2018 Nominee (RI)
Soaring Eagle Book Award 2016-2017 Nominee (WY)
South Dakota Teen Choice Book Award 2016-2017 Nominee (SD)
Tayshas 2017 Master List (TX)
Thumbs Up Award 2017 Honor Titles (MI)
Virginia Reader's Choice Award 2017-2018 Winners (VA)
Volunteer State Book Award 2017-2018 Nominee (TN)
Westchester Fiction Award 2017 Winner (CA)
Young Hoosier Book Award 2018-2019 Nominee (IN)

References

2016 American novels
2016 children's books
 American children's novels
 American war novels
 Carnegie Medal in Literature winning works
 Children's historical novels
 Novels set during World War II
 Penguin Books books
 Philomel Books books